Fada is the capital of the Ennedi-Ouest Region of Chad, which was created in 2012 from the western half of the Ennedi Region.

Lying in the Ennedi Plateau, it has a population of 23,786 (as of December 2005). It is known for the surrounding cave paintings and rock formations, while the Guelta d'Archei and a wood growing in a wadi are local attractions.

During the Toyota War in 1987, the town saw fighting during the Battle of Fada.

The town is served by Fada Airport.

History 
Rock paintings and archaeological artifacts at nearby Guelta d'Archei, a UNESCO World Heritage Site, show evidence that humans occupied the area around 10,000 BCE during the African humid period. 

Idriss Déby, a former military officer and president of Chad, was born in the village of Berdoba, about 190 kilometres from Fada. As a student, he attended the École-Francaise in studying the French language.

On 2 January 1987, during the Toyota War, Fada was the scene of a battle fought between Chad and the armed forces of the Libyan Arab Jamahiriya and the Democratic Revolutionary Council. The battle was marked as a turning point of the Chadian-Libyan conflict.

References

External links

Populated places in Chad
Ennedi-Ouest Region